Asobi Seksu is the debut studio album by American shoegaze band Asobi Seksu. It was self-released by the band in 2002. The album was reissued on May 18, 2004 in the United States by Friendly Fire Recordings and on June 4, 2007 in the United Kingdom by One Little Indian Records.

Track listing

Personnel
Credits are adapted from the liner notes of the 2002 and 2004 issues of the album.

Asobi Seksu
 Yuki Chikudate – keyboards, vocals
 James Hanna – guitar, vocals
 Keith Hopkin – drums
 Glenn Waldman – bass

Production
 Matt Anuskiewicz – assistance (production)
 Will Quinnell – engineering, mastering, mixing, recording
 Brian Ward – recording (bass tracks)

Design
 Asobi Seksu – cover design and layout (2002 issue)
 Annie Chiu – styling and assistance (2004 issue)
 Jim Donnelly – inside photography (2002 issue)
 Noah Kalina – cover photography (2002 issue)
 Sean McCabe – design and photography (2004 issue)

References

External links
 
 

2002 debut albums
Asobi Seksu albums
Self-released albums
One Little Independent Records albums